| purse      = £120,000 (2020)1st: £68,340
|}

The Yorkshire Rose Mares' Hurdle is a Grade 2 National Hunt horse race in Great Britain which is open to mares aged four years or older. It is run at Doncaster over a distance of about 2 miles and half a furlong (2 miles and 128 yards or 3,335 metres), and during its running there are eight hurdles to be jumped. The race is scheduled to take place each year in late January or early February. It was first run in 2008.

Winners

 The 2011 and 2013 runnings were abandoned because of frost.

See also
 Horseracing in Great Britain
 List of British National Hunt races

References
 Racing Post:
 , 

 pedigreequery.com – Doncaster Mares' Hurdle – Doncaster.

National Hunt races in Great Britain
Doncaster Racecourse
National Hunt hurdle races